Events in the year 2017 in Moldova.

Incumbents
 President – Igor Dodon
 Prime Minister – Pavel Filip
 President of the Parliament – Andrian Candu

Events

January

January 4 - President Igor Dodon visited the city of Bender in the breakaway republic of Transnistria, making hin the first Moldovan leader to visit the region since 2009.

April
April 19 - Moldova is granted observer Status in the Eurasian Economic Union in April 2017.

October

October 17 - The Constitutional Court of Moldova temporarily suspended President Igor Dodon's powers as President of Moldova for failing to appoint in proposed Eugen Sturza as Defence Minister.

December
December 2 - Celebrations in honour of the 100th anniversary of the proclamation of the Moldovan Democratic Republic took place.

Deaths

28 January – Ion Ungureanu, actor and politician (b. 1935).
29 January – Ruslan Barburoș, footballer (b. 1978).
3 February – Gheorghe Pârlea, actor (b.1944)

References

 
2010s in Moldova
Moldova
Moldova
Years of the 21st century in Moldova